Michael Boulanger (born August 21, 1949, at Ponca City, Oklahoma) is an American baseball coach and scout. He is scheduled to spend the  season as a scout for the Baltimore Orioles of Major League Baseball, after working in 2012–2013 as the Orioles' minor league hitting coordinator.

Boulanger, nicknamed "Bo," graduated from Ponca City High School and Oklahoma State University, where he played baseball and football. He was a center fielder in his playing days, standing 6 feet (1.83 m) tall, weighing 180 pounds (82 kg). He threw and batted right-handed. Boulanger did not play professional baseball, but instead immediately went into  coaching at Broken Arrow High School in Oklahoma in 1971. From 1977–94, he served in the college ranks, as an assistant coach at the University of Oklahoma and then as head coach at Oklahoma City University and the University of Southwestern Louisiana, compiling a record of 353 wins and 204 defeats (.634).

In  he joined the Texas Rangers' system as a minor league coach and roving minor league hitting coordinator, serving through 2011.

References

External links

1949 births
Living people
Baltimore Orioles scouts
High school baseball coaches in the United States
Louisiana Ragin' Cajuns baseball coaches
Lowell Spinners managers
Oklahoma City Stars baseball coaches
Oklahoma Sooners baseball coaches
Oklahoma State Cowboys baseball players
Oklahoma State Cowboys football players
People from Ponca City, Oklahoma